The Policewoman is an independent Portuguese drama film directed by Joaquim Sapinho, produced at Rosa Filmes, which had its world premiere in 2003 at the Berlin International Film Festival.

Plot 
The film tells the story of a mother and a son from the interior of Portugal that run away to Lisbon to avoid being separated by the state institutions that want to take the child away from the mother.

Cast 
 Amélia Corôa as Tânia
 Luduvic Vieira as Rato
 Maria Silva as Liliana
 Vítor Norte as the Truck Driver
 Ana Nave as the Policewoman

Production 
The Policewoman was shot in and around Sabugal, Portugal, Sapinho's birthplace. Released in 2003, The Policewoman was shot while Sapinho was in the editing process of his feature documentary Bosnia Diaries, which was filmed a couple of years earlier in Bosnia during the Yugoslav Wars. Bosnia Diaries would eventually be released in 2005. The two films were post-produced simultaneously, influencing each other both in style and theme. The darkness, realism and harshness of The Policewoman clearly echoes the Bosnian War experienced by Sapinho. That experience of war would cause a great change to his vision of the world, leading him, when shooting The Policewoman, to discover in Portugal things he thought had only happened in Bosnia in consequence of the war. It made him realize that, after all, they were also happening in his native town in consequence of the economic transformations imposed by capitalism via the European Union.

Reception 
Besides having had its world premiere in 2003, at the Berlin International Film Festival, The Policewoman was part of the official selection of innumerous film festivals, like the Edinburgh Film Festival or the Pusan Film Festival. Received in the Lecce European Film Festival the award for Best Film and Best Photography.

References

External links 
 The Policewoman official page at Rosa Filmes web site (click on "ENG", then on "DIRECTORS", then on "JOAQUIM SAPINHO", then on "THE POLICE WOMAN")
 

Portuguese drama films
2000s Portuguese-language films
2003 films
Films directed by Joaquim Sapinho
Films set in Portugal
Films shot in Portugal
2003 drama films